Flechtingen is a Verbandsgemeinde ("collective municipality") in the Börde district, in Saxony-Anhalt, Germany. Before 1 January 2010, it was a Verwaltungsgemeinschaft. The seat of the Verbandsgemeinde is in Flechtingen.

The Verbandsgemeinde Flechtingen consists of the following municipalities:

 Altenhausen 
 Beendorf 
 Bülstringen 
 Calvörde 
 Erxleben 
 Flechtingen
 Ingersleben

References

Verbandsgemeinden in Saxony-Anhalt